John F. Nolan (April 30, 1933 – April 7, 2000) was an American film, stage and television actor. He was known for playing the recurring role as John the bartender in the medical drama television series Quincy, M.E.. He also lent his talents to at least 23 other television shows and films including Adam-12, Marcus Welby, M.D. and the 1970 film Airport.

Filmography

The Hot Angel (1958) - Ray
-30- (1959) - Ron Danton
The Last Time I Saw Archie (1961) - Lt. Oglemeyer
The Big Mouth (1967) - F.B.I. Agent
Hook, Line & Sinker (1969) - Carte Blanche Man (uncredited)
Airport (1970) - Richard Ross - Passenger (uncredited)
Which Way to the Front? (1970) - German Officer (uncredited)

References

External links

1933 births
2000 deaths
People from Brooklyn
Male actors from New York City
American male film actors
American male stage actors
American male television actors
20th-century American male actors